Verena Hanshaw (née Aschauer, born 20 January 1994) is an Austrian footballer who plays as a defender for German Frauen-Bundesliga club Eintracht Frankfurt and the Austria women's national team. She previously played for USC Landhaus Wien in the Austrian Frauenliga, Herforder SV and Cloppenburg.

She was an Under-19 international.

International goals

Notes

References

1994 births
Living people
Austrian women's footballers
Expatriate women's footballers in Germany
USC Landhaus Wien players
Austria women's international footballers
Austrian expatriate sportspeople in Germany
Austrian expatriate women's footballers
Women's association football defenders
SC Freiburg (women) players
SC Sand players
1. FFC Frankfurt players
Eintracht Frankfurt (women) players
Frauen-Bundesliga players
ÖFB-Frauenliga players
UEFA Women's Euro 2022 players
UEFA Women's Euro 2017 players